Kimball House may refer to:

in the United States (by state then town)
Kimball House (Dardanelle, Arkansas), listed on the National Register of Historic Places (NRHP) in Yell County
Kimball House (Atlanta), Georgia, historic hotels
William W. Kimball House, Chicago, Illinois, listed on the NRHP in Cook County
Kimball–Stevenson House, Davenport, Iowa, listed on the NRHP in Scott County
W.W. Kimball House, Arlington, Massachusetts, listed on the NRHP in Middlesex County
Farley-Hutchinson-Kimball House, Bedford, Massachusetts, listed on the NRHP in Middlesex County
C. Henry Kimball House, Chelsea, Massachusetts, listed on the NRHP in Suffolk County
Hazen-Kimball-Aldrich House, Georgetown, Massachusetts, listed on the NRHP in Essex County
Solomon Kimball House (Wenham, Massachusetts), listed on the NRHP in Essex County
Mary Rogers Kimball House, Omaha, Nebraska, listed on the NRHP in Douglas County
Kimball Castle, Gilford, New Hampshire, listed on the NRHP in Belknap County
Lemuel Kimball, II, House, listed on the NRHP in Lake County
Solomon Kimball House (Madison, Ohio), listed on the NRHP in Lake County
Addison Kimball House, Madison, Ohio, listed on the NRHP in Lake County
Kimball House (Mechanicsburg, Ohio), listed on the NRHP in Champaign County
Burt Kimball House, Park City, Utah, listed on the NRHP in Summit County
Ernest Lynn Kimball House, Park City, Utah, listed on the NRHP in Summit County
Alanson M. Kimball House, Pine River, Wisconsin, listed on the NRHP in Waushara County

See also
Solomon Kimball House (disambiguation)